Bahawalpur (Urdu) was a princely state of British India, and later Dominion of Pakistan, that was a part of the Punjab States Agency. It existed as an autonomous state, within Pakistan from 1947 to 1955, when it was dissolved and merged into the West Pakistani Province. The capital of the state was the town of Bahawalpur. 

The Bahawalpur state was founded in 1609 AD by Nawab Bahawal Khan Abbasi. On 22 February 1833, Abbasi III entered into a subsidiary alliance with the British, by which Bahawalpur was admitted as a princely state of British India. When British rule ended in 1947 and British India was partitioned into India and Pakistan, Bahawalpur joined the Dominion of Pakistan. Bahawalpur remained an autonomous entity until 14 October 1955, when it was merged with the province of West Pakistan.

History
The Abbasi tribe from whom the ruling family of Bahawalpur belongs, claim descent from the Abbasid Caliphs. The tribe then came to Bahawalpur in the middle of the 17th century and assumed independence during the decline of the Durrani Empire. Upon establishment of Abbasi rule in the region around Uch, the clan's Nawab established canals as a matter of statecraft in order to help incorporate Daudpotra kinsmen. Bahawalpur kings (Daudputras) were the cousin brothers of Kalhoras of Sindh.

Bahawalpur along with other Cis-Sutlej states were a group of states, lying between the Sutlej River on the north, the Himalayas on the east, the Yamuna River and Delhi District on the south, and Sirsa District on the west. These states were ruled by the Scindhia dynasty as Vakil-e-Mutlaq of the Mughal Empire, various Sikh sardars and other Rajas of the Cis-Sutlej states paid tributes to the Marathas, until the Second Anglo-Maratha War of 1803–1805, after which the Marathas lost this territory to the British.

As part of the 1809 Treaty of Amritsar, Ranjit Singh was confined to the right bank of the Sutlej. The first treaty with Bahawalpur was negotiated in 1833, the year after the treaty with Ranjit Singh for regulating traffic on the Indus. It secured the independence of the Nawab within his own territories and opened up the traffic on the Indus and Sutlej. The political relations of Bahawalpur with the paramount power, as at present existing, are regulated by a treaty made in October 1838, when arrangements were in progress for the restoration of Shah Shuja to the Kabul throne.

During the First Anglo-Afghan War, the Nawab assisted the British with supplies and allowing passage and in 1847-8 he co-operated actively with Sir Herbert Edwardes in the expedition against Multan. For these services, he was rewarded by the grant of the districts of Sabzalkot and Bhung, together with a life-pension of a lakh. On his death, a dispute arose regarding succession. He was succeeded by his third son, whom he had nominated in place of his eldest son. The new ruler was, however, deposed by his elder brother, and obtained asylum in British territory, with a pension from the Bahawalpur revenues; he broke his promise to abandon his claims and was confined in the Lahore Fort, where he died in 1862.

In 1863 and 1866 insurrections broke out against the Nawab who successfully crushed the rebellions; but in March 1866, the Nawab died suddenly, not without suspicion of having been poisoned, and was succeeded by his son, Nawab Sadiq Muhammad Khan IV, a boy of four. After several endeavors to arrange for the administration of the country without active interference on the part of the Government, it was found necessary, on account of disorganization and disaffection, to place the principality in British hands. In 1879, the Nawab was invested with full powers, with the advice and assistance of a council of six members. During the Afghan campaigns (1878–80) the Nawab placed the entire resources of his State at the disposal of the British Indian Government, and a contingent of his troops was employed in keeping open communications, and in guarding the Dera Ghazi Khan frontier. On his death in 1899 he was succeeded by Muhammad Bahawal Khan V, who attained his majority in 1900, and was invested with full powers in 1903. The Nawab of Bahawalpur was entitled to a salute of 17 guns.

Bahawalpur House in Delhi is now home to the National School of Drama.

Independence of Pakistan
The predominantly Muslim population supported Muslim League and Pakistan Movement.  After the independence of Pakistan in 1947, the minority Hindus and Sikhs migrated to India while the Muslim refugees from India settled in the Bahawalpur state. After the independence of Pakistan, the Nawab of Bahawalpur Sadeq Mohammad Khan V proved to be very helpful and generous to the government of Pakistan. He gave seventy million rupees to the government and the salaries of all the government departments for a couple of months were also drawn from the treasury of Bahawalpur state. He donated his private property to the University of the Punjab, King Edward Medical College and the Mosque of Aitchison College, Lahore. At the time of independence, all the princely states of the British India were given a choice to join either Pakistan or India or to remain independent, outside both. On 5 October 1947 the Nawab signed an agreement with the government of Pakistan according to which Bahawalpur State acceded to Pakistan, and the accession was accepted on 9 October. Thus the State of Bahawalpur was the first state to accede to Pakistan. Moreover, the Nawab and Muhammad Ali Jinnah were close friends and they had great respect for each other even before the creation of Pakistan. The Ameer of Bahawalpur Refugee Relief and Rehabilitation Fund was instituted in 1947 for providing a central organization for the relief of the refugees. The Quaid-e-Azam acknowledged the valuable contribution of the Bahawalpur State for the rehabilitation of the refugees.

In 1953, the Nawab represented Pakistan at the installation of Faisal II of Iraq and at the coronation of Elizabeth II. In 1955 an accord was signed between Nawab Sadiq Muhammad and General Ghulam Muhammad Malik according to which Bahawalpur State became the part of the province of West Pakistan and [former] Nawab began to receive a yearly stipend of 32 lakh rupees, maintained the title of Nawab and protocol inside and outside Pakistan. In May 1966 Nawab Sadiq, the last ruling Nawab of Bahawalpur died in London which ended his 59 year long reign; his dead body was brought to Bahawalpur and was buried in his ancestral graveyard of Derawer Fort. His eldest son Haji Muhammad Abbas Khan Abbasi Bahadur succeeded to his title of Nawab of Bahawalpur, but with no administrative or political power. Abbas's son Salah ud-Din Muhammad Khan currently holds the title of the Nawab.

Legacy 

Even though with no power, the Nawabs of Bahawalpur and the noble family is still highly respected in the region.  Nawab Salahud-Din Ahmed Abbasi, the grandson of the last ruling Nawab, is one of the most important political figures in the region. Although the Nawabs were autocratic rulers, who did not allow or give political freedom, they did a lot for the development of the State, which benefited the people. The first Nawab laid the foundation of the State in 1727, with only a small locality, very soon the latter Movement for Bahawalpur Province. Nawabs started expanding the domain of the State. Not only did they gain a lot of land, they also made it one of the richest states of the sub-continent. A lot of development work was done in the State in all fields. Schools, colleges and later a university were opened. A number of scholarships were given to students even outside the State. Railway track was laid by the Nawabs in the State. Hospitals and dispensaries were established. Canals were dug and the Sultej Valley Project was completed to provide water to the lands of Bahawalpur region. The State had its own administrative and judicial system.

The Nawabs gifted portions of their land in Lahore to Punjab University, while the mosque at Aitchison College was also gifted by the Nawab. The Bahawalpur Block of the King Edward Medical College was also donated by the Nawab.

Royal House of Bahawalpur
The Royal House of Bahawalpur is said to be of Arabic origin and claims descent from Abbas ibn Abd al-Muttalib, progenitor of the Abbasid Caliphs of Baghdad and Cairo. Sultan Ahmad II, son of Shah Muzammil of Egypt left that country and arrived in Sindh with a large following of Arabs ca. 1370. He married a daughter of Raja Rai Dhorang Sahta, receiving a third of the country in dowry. Amir Fathu'llah Khan Abbasi, is the recognized ancestor of the dynasty. He conquered the Bhangarh territory from Raja Dallu, of Alor and Bhamanabad, renaming it Qahir Bela.

Amir Muhammad Chani Khan Abbasi entered the imperial service and gained appointment as a Panchhazari in 1583. At his death, the leadership of the tribe was contested between two branches of the family, the Daudputras and the Kalhoras. Amir Bahadur Khan Abbasi abandoned Tarai and settled near Bhakkar, founding the town of Shikarpur in 1690. Daud Khan, the first of his family to rule Bahawalpur, originated from Scind where he had opposed the Afghan Governor of that province and was forced to flee.

Demography 

In 1941, Bahawalpur had a population of 1,341,209 of whom 737,474 (54.98%) were men and 603,735 (45.02%) were women. Bahawalpur had a literacy rate of 2.8% (5.1% for males and 0.1% for females) in 1901. The bulk of the population (two-thirds) lived on the fertile Indus River banks with the eastern desert tract being sparsely populated.

Between 1916 and 1941, the population had almost doubled due to the Sutlej Valley Project when vast amounts of Bahawalpur territory were opened to irrigation. There was a migration of Muslims, Hindus and Sikhs to Bahawalpur from other parts of Punjab. These colonists were labelled non-Riyasatis as opposed to locals or "Riyasatis" and were systematically discriminated against in government appointments.

Religion 
The state was predominantly Muslim. According to the 1941 census, Muslims made up 81.9% (1,098,814) of the state's population while Hindus numbered 174,408 (13%) and Sikhs numbered 46,945 (1.84%). While a majority of Muslims and Hindus had their origins in Bahawalpur, a considerable proportion of settlers were migrants from other parts of the Punjab. The Sikhs, on the other hand, were predominantly colonists who had migrated after the opening of canal colonies.

Rulers

The rulers of Bahawalpur were Abbasids who came from Shikarpur and Sukkur and captured the areas that became Bahawalpur State. They took the title of Amir until 1740, when the title changed to Nawab Amir. Although the title was abolished in 1955 by the Government of Pakistan, the current head of the House of Bahawalpur (Salah ud-Din Muhammad Khan) is referred to as the Amir. From 1942, the Nawabs were assisted by Prime Ministers.

20th century onwards, Sadeq Muhammad Khan V was the Nawab and later Emir of Bahawalpur State from 1907 to 1966. He became the Nawab on the death of his father, when he was only three years old. In 1955 he signed an agreement with the Governor-General of Pakistan, Malik Ghulam Muhammad, under which Bahawalpur became part of the province of West Pakistan, with effect from 14 October 1955, and the Ameer received a yearly privy purse of 32 lakhs of rupees, keeping his titles. Other members of the present day form of the royal family include: HH Nawab Brig. Muhammad Abbas Khan Abbasi (Last Nawab of Bahawalpur, former Governor of Punjab); Nawab Salahuddin Ahmed Abbasi (Urdu: نواب صلاح الدین عباسی) who is a member of parliament in Pakistan. He is also the grandson of Sadeq Mohammad Khan V, who was the last ruling Nawab of the Princely State Bahawalpur. Prince Muhammad Bahawal (who studied at Aitchison College in Lahore, and graduated from King's College London with a degree in International Political Economy and joined PTI), Prince Falahuddin Abbasi (who died in London in April 2016 from cancer), Begum of Bahawalpur, Princess Aiysha Yasmien Abbasi and Princess Safia Nausheen Abbasi.

See Also
History of Punjab

References

Further reading
Nazeer 'Ali Shah, The History of the Bahawalpur State. Lahore: Maktaba Jadeed, 1959.

External links

Nawabs of Bahawalpur
 Bahawalpur Information
 TMA Bahawalpur City website

 
States and territories established in 1690
Princely states of Pakistan
1609 establishments in Asia
1802 establishments in Asia
1955 disestablishments in Pakistan
Arab dynasties
Muslim princely states of India